This is a list of notable German photojournalists. For photojournalists of other nationalities, see list of photojournalists.

 Erich Andres
 Katharina Behrend
 Lucas Dolega
 Thomas Dworzak
 Frauke Eigen
 Alfred Eisenstaedt
 Horst Faas
 Jockel Finck
 Herbert Gauls
 Lisel Haas
 Heinz Hajek-Halke
 Erich Hartmann (photographer)
 Roswitha Hecke
 Louis Held
 Hans Hildenbrand
 Max Hofmann
 Kurt Hutton
 Alex Kempkens
 Robert Lebeck
 Hans G. Lehmann
 Felix H. Man
 Josephine Meckseper
 Reiner Merkel
 Hansel Mieth
 Anja Niedringhaus
 Francis Reiss
 Günter Rössler
 Erich Salomon
 Hans-Joachim Spremberg
 Gerda Taro
 Ingmar Zahorsky

See also 
 List of photojournalists (Dynamic list by country of origin)
 Lists of journalists
 List of photographers
 National Press Photographers Association

References